This is a list of video games published and/or developed by PopCap Games.

List of games

2011-present

Developed and/or published

Currently supported 
 Alchemy (2001)
 AstroPop (2004)
 Atomica (2002)
 Banana Bugs (2010)
 Bejeweled (2001)
 Bejeweled 2 (2004)
 Bejeweled 3 (2010)
 Bejeweled Blitz (2010)
 Bejeweled Twist (2008)
 Bejeweled Legends (2012, canceled and only in Japan)
 Bejeweled Stars (2016)
 Bejeweled Champions (2020)
 Big Money! (2002)
 Bonnie's Bookstore (2006)
 Bookworm (2003)
 Bookworm Adventures (2006)
 Bookworm Adventures: Volume 2 (2009)
 Cosmic Bugs (2005)
 Chuzzle (2005)
 Chuzzle: Christmas Edition (2008)
 Dynomite! (2002)
 Feeding Frenzy (2004)
 Feeding Frenzy 2: Shipwreck Showdown (2006)
 Gyromancer (2009)
 Hammer Heads (2006)
 Heavy Weapon (2005)
 Iggle Pop! (2006)
 Insaniquarium (2002)
 Mummy Maze (2002)
 NingPo MahJong (2002)
 Noah's Ark (2002)
 Peggle (2007)
 Peggle 2 (2013)
 Peggle Nights (2008)
 Plants vs. Zombies (2009)
 Pixelus (2004)
 Pizza Frenzy (2005)
 Rocket Mania! (2003)
 Seven Seas (2001)
 Solitaire Blitz (2012)
 Talismania (2006)
 TipTop (2002)
 Typer Shark! (2003)
 Venice (2007)
 The Wizard's Pen (2008)
 Water Bugs (2007)
 Word Harmony (2006)
 Word Stalk 
 Zuma (2003)
 Zuma's Revenge! (2009)
 Zuma Blitz (2010)

From SpinTop Games 
 Amazing Adventures: Around the World
 Amazing Adventures: The Caribbean Secret
 Amazing Adventures: The Forgotten Dynasty
 Amazing Adventures: The Lost Tomb
 Amazing Adventures: The Riddle Of The Two Knights
 Escape The Emerald Star
 Escape Rosecliff Island
 Escape Whisper Valley
 Hidden Identity – Chicago Blackout
 Mystery P.I.: Lost in Los Angeles
 Mystery P.I.: Stolen in San Francisco
 Mystery P.I.: The London Caper
 Mystery P.I.: The Lottery Ticket
 Mystery P.I.: The New York Fortune
 Mystery P.I.: The Vegas Heist
 Mystery P.I.: The Curious Case of Counterfeit Cove
 Mystery Solitaire
 Vacation Quest - The Hawaiian Islands
 Vacation Quest - Australia

From 4th and Battery 
 Allied Star Police
 Unpleasant Horse

Cancelled 
 Atomic Poker (multiplayer game)
 Baking Life
 Bookworm Heroes
 Candy Train (2001)
 Lucky Penny (multiplayer game)
 Plants vs. Zombies Adventures
 Popcorn Dragon
 Psychobabble (multiplayer game)

References

External links 
 PopCap Games
 PopCap Games: Download Games

PopCap
L